Prison Shadows is a 1936 American crime film directed by Robert F. Hill and starring Edward J. Nugent, Lucille Lund and Joan Barclay.

Plot 
Gene Harris, a prizefighter, is sentenced to five years in prison after killing an opponent in the ring. Gene's trainer Moran is suspicious of promoter George Miller, whose accomplice Claire Thomas is pretending to be in love with Gene while double-crossing him.

Gene is paroled after three years. He returns to boxing, supported by Mary Comstock, a girl from Miller's office who believes in Gene's innocence, even after another foe dies while fighting him. They discover that an undetectable poison is being used on the fighters' towels. Overhearing a plot to kill him the same way, Gene plays dead and is carried out, setting a trap with the police  that the villains fall into right after the fight.

Cast 
Edward J. Nugent as Gene Harris
Lucille Lund as Claire Thomas
Joan Barclay as Mary Comstock
Forrest Taylor as George Miller
Syd Saylor as Dave Moran
Monte Blue as Bert McNamee
John Elliott as The Police Captain
Jack Cowell as Graham, Murphy's manager
Willard Kent as Veterinarian
Walter O'Keefe as John Halligan, referee
 Martha Wentworth as 	Mrs. Murphy
 Lloyd Ingraham as Prison Warden
 Murdock MacQuarrie as Fight Fan
 Arthur Thalasso as 	Coroner
 Dorothy Vernon as 	Waitress at Tea Room
 Jack Cheatham as Cop 
Corky as Babe, Gene's Dog

References

Bibliography
 Pitts, Michael R. Poverty Row Studios, 1929-1940. McFarland & Company, 2005.

External links 

1936 films
1936 crime drama films
1930s English-language films
American black-and-white films
American crime drama films
Films directed by Robert F. Hill
1930s American films